Hypotrachyna anzeana is a species of foliose lichen in the family Parmeliaceae. The specific epithet honours the collector of the type specimen, the environmental biologist Rafael Anze Martin.

References

anzeana
Lichen species
Lichens described in 2009
Lichens of Bolivia
Lichens of Colombia
Taxa named by John Alan Elix
Taxa named by Thomas Hawkes Nash III
Taxa named by Harrie Sipman